Armanti Fredrico Edwards Sr. (born March 8, 1988) is an American gridiron football wide receiver who is currently a free agent. He most recently played for the Edmonton Elks of the Canadian Football League (CFL). He was drafted by the Carolina Panthers in the third round of the 2010 NFL Draft. He was the starting quarterback for the Appalachian State Mountaineers football team from 2006–09. As quarterback in 2007, Edwards led Appalachian State to one of the biggest upsets in college football history, a 34–32 victory over then fifth-ranked Michigan.

In addition to leading the Mountaineers to consecutive NCAA Division I Football Championships (FCS) in 2006 and 2007, Edwards became the first quarterback in Southern Conference history to lead his team to four straight conference championships. He became the first quarterback in NCAA Division I history to throw for 9,000 and rush for 4,000 yards in a career, accomplishing the feat against Furman on October 31, 2009. Later in the season, he would become the first quarterback to pass for over 10,000 yards and rush for an additional 4,000 yards in a career. He is also the first back-to-back and two-time Walter Payton Award winner, given to the Football Championship Subdivision's most outstanding offensive player, receiving the award in 2008 and 2009.

Early life
Armanti is the son of Deborah Anderson and Freddie Edwards. At birth, Edwards weighed 4 pounds 11 ounces and was delivered 10 days late. In September 2006, his father, Freddie, was convicted of a 2005 murder and sentenced to 30 years in prison. The conviction however was overturned because jurors were not given the option of finding Edwards guilty of involuntary manslaughter. During a retrial that concluded in June 2011 he was again convicted of murder and again sentenced to 30 years.

High school career
At Greenwood High, under coach Shell Dula, he was named to the Greenwood Touchdown Club/Index-Journal All-Lakelands Team. Edwards originally played wide receiver, but in his senior year, he moved under center. The transition occurred late in the recruiting process, and he drew some interest from New Mexico State, Memphis, South Carolina, and Vanderbilt. After only receiving an offer from New Mexico State, he decided to honor his commitment to Appalachian State, in part because they would let him stay a quarterback. Armanti Edwards graduated with a 3.3 GPA.

College career

2006 season
Armanti Edwards led the Mountaineers to the FCS (formerly Division I-AA) National Championship in 2006 as a true freshman, beating the Minutemen of UMass 28–17. He finished the 2006 season with 2,251 yards and 15 touchdowns passing, and 1,153 yards and 15 touchdowns rushing. Edwards joined a select list as the fifth Division I player (Missouri's Brad Smith and Texas's Vince Young are among the others), and second freshman, to accomplish the feat of 2000 passing yards and 1000 rushing yards in one season. Edwards was named the Southern Conference Freshman of the Year at the end of the season.

2007 season
Edwards started the 2007 season by guiding Appalachian State to a 34–32 upset victory over fifth-ranked Michigan of the Football Bowl Subdivision on September 1, in a game that was named the "Biggest Upset of 2007" by Sports Illustrated. In the game, Edwards threw for 227 yards and three touchdowns while also totaling 62 yards and a touchdown on the ground. On December 7, in a semifinal playoff game against Richmond, Edwards set the single game FCS rushing record for a quarterback, rushing for 313 yards and 4 touchdowns on 31 carries. He also completed 14-of-16 passes for 192 yards and 3 touchdowns. Edwards had been mentioned as a possible candidate for the Heisman Trophy in the 2008 season. Edwards established himself as a threat through the air and along the ground, and garnered elite status within the division. He and the Mountaineers won a third consecutive national championship, beating the Delaware Fightin' Blue Hens, 49–21, in the championship game on December 14. He outplayed future Baltimore Ravens quarterback Joe Flacco in that game.

2008 season

The Mountaineers began the 2008 campaign against the LSU Tigers, the first time defending FBS and FCS champions have met to open the season. However, LSU prevailed 41-13, with Edwards accounting for 216 of Appalachian State's 472 total yards. Edwards accounted for 440 yards of total offense, becoming the Southern Conference's all-time leader in yards with a 70–24 victory over the Wofford Terriers on October 31. On November 15, the Mountaineers clinched the Southern Conference championship, joining West Virginia (1953–56), Furman (1980–83) and Georgia Southern (1997–2002) as the only programs to win four straight titles, with a 24–16 victory over the Elon Phoenix. In his 36th career start, he became the 26th FCS player in history to surpass 10,000 yards of career total offense in Appalachian's win over South Carolina State in the First Round of the 2008 playoffs. He was named the 2008 Southern Conference Offensive Player of the Year, and was the winner of the 2008 Walter Payton Award, given to the top FCS offensive player. Edwards threw a career-worst 5 interceptions in a quarterfinal loss to eventual tournament winner, Richmond, denying Appalachian State their 4th consecutive FCS championship.

2009 season
Before the start of the season, Edwards was involved in a lawn mowing accident, resulting in a trip to the hospital where he was treated and released. The injury sidelined him for the season opener against the East Carolina Pirates, a game which the Mountaineers would lose 29–24. With a 27–10 victory over Elon on November 14, Edwards became the only quarterback in conference history to win four consecutive championships. Edwards's college football career ended on December 12 in a playoff semi-final game against the Montana Grizzlies. The 24–17 loss was the highest rated FCS postseason game ever broadcast according to Nielsen and the NCAA. The following day, Edwards graduated after just three and a half years with a degree in graphic arts. On December 17, in a landslide victory, Edwards received the Walter Payton Award making him the first ever two-time recipient of the award.

Statistics

Highlights and awards

Championships
 NCAA Division I Football Championship – 2006, 2007
 Southern Conference Championship – 2006, 2007, 2008, 2009

Awards
 Walter Payton Award – 2008, 2009
 Southern Conference Bob Waters Male Athlete of the Year – 2010
 Southern Conference Roy M. "Legs" Hawley Offensive Player of the Year (media) – 2008*, 2009*
 Southern Conference Offensive Player of the Year (coaches) – 2008, 2009
 Southern Conference Freshman of the Year (coaches and media) – 2006
 All-Southern Conference Football Team:
 1st Team (media) – 2006, 2008, 2009
 1st Team (coaches) – 2006, 2008, 2009
 2nd Team (coaches) – 2007
 5x Southern Conference Offensive Player of the Month – 11/2006, 11/2007, 10/2008, 11/2008, 10/2009
 8x Southern Conference Offensive Player of the Week
 5x Southern Conference Freshman of the Week
* - Unanimous selection

Records

Single game
ASU and Southern – Rushing: 313 vs. Richmond, 2007
ASU – Rushing Yards Per Attempts: 10.1 vs. Richmond, 2007
ASU, Southern, and NCAA – Rushing Yards by a Quarterback: 313 vs. Richmond, 2007
ASU – Passing Yards: 433 vs. South Carolina State, 2008
ASU – Completion Percentage (min. 10 comp.): .895 (17-19) vs. Wofford, 2008
ASU – Touchdown Passes: 5 vs. Wofford, 2008
ASU – Touchdowns Responsible For: 7 vs. Richmond, 2007

Single season
ASU – Rushing Yards by a Quarterback: 1,588, 2007
ASU – Rushing Yards by a Freshman: 1,153, 2006
ASU – Rushing Yards by a Sophomore: 1,588, 2007
ASU – Passing Yards: 3,291, 2009
ASU - Pass Attempts: 378, 2009
ASU – Pass Completions: 257, 2009
ASU – Completion Percentage (min. 100 comp.): .680 (257-378), 2009
ASU – Passing Efficiency: 170.2, 2008
ASU – Touchdown Passes: 30, 2008
ASU – 200-Yard Passing Games: 10, 2009
ASU – Consecutive 200-Yard Passing Games: 5, 2009
ASU – Passing Yards by a Freshman: 2,251, 2006
ASU – Passing Yards by a Sophomore: 1,948, 2007
ASU – Passing Yards by a Senior: 3,291, 2009
ASU and Southern – Total Offense: 3,970, 2009
ASU and Southern – Touchdowns Responsible For: 41, 2008
ASU and Southern – 250-Yard Total Offense Games: 10, 2008
ASU – Consecutive 250-Yard Total Offense Games: 5 (four times)
ASU and Southern – 300-Yard Total Offense Games: 8, 2009
ASU – 400-Yard Total Offense Games: 4, 2009
ASU – Wins By a Starting Quarterback: 13, 2006

Postseason
ASU – Single-Game Rushing Yards: 313 vs. Richmond, 2007
ASU – Single-Game Rushing Touchdowns: 4 vs. Richmond, 2007
ASU – Single-Game Pass Attempts: 54 vs. Montana, 2009
ASU – Career Pass Attempts: 342
ASU – Single-Game Completions: 29 vs. South Carolina State, 2008
ASU – Career Completions: 216
ASU – Single-Game Passing Yards: 433 vs. South Carolina State, 2008
ASU – Career Passing Yards: 2,885
ASU – Single-Game Touchdown Passes: 4 vs. South Carolina State, 2008
ASU – Career Touchdown Passes: 19
ASU – Single-Game Total Offense Attempts: 69 vs. Montana, 2009
ASU – Career Total Offense Attempts: 564
ASU – Single-Game Total Offense Yards: 495 vs. Richmond, 2007
ASU – Career Total Offense Yards: 4,186
ASU – Single-Game Touchdowns Responsible For: 7 vs. Richmond, 2007
ASU – Career Touchdowns Responsible For: 37
ASU – Single-Game Touchdowns Scored: 4 vs. Richmond, 2007
ASU – Single-Game Points Scored: 24 vs. Richmond, 2007
ASU – Postseason Wins By a Starting Quarterback: 11

Career
ASU and Southern – Rushing Yards by a Quarterback: 4,361
ASU – Passing Yards: 10,392
ASU – Pass Attempts: 1,180
ASU – Pass Completions: 768
ASU and Southern – Completion Percentage (min. 250 comp.): .651
ASU – Passing Efficiency: 154.2
ASU – Touchdown Passes: 74
ASU – Passing Yards per Game: 203.8
ASU – 200-Yard Passing Games: 24
ASU and Southern – Total Offense Attempts: 1,935
ASU and Southern – Total Offense: 14,753
ASU – Total Offense Per Game: 289.3
ASU and Southern – Touchdowns Responsible For: 139
ASU and Southern – 250-Yard Total Offense Games: 35
ASU and Southern – 300-Yard Total Offense Games: 24
ASU – 400-Yard Total Offense Games: 8
ASU – Wins By a Starting Quarterback: 42

Professional career

Carolina Panthers
Edwards was selected in the third round, pick #89, of the 2010 draft by the Carolina Panthers. Edwards could see the field at a variety of positions including wide receiver, kickoff returner, and quarterback in the wildcat formation. He was first activated in the 2010 season for the October 10 game against the Chicago Bears. After a 34-3 loss against New Orleans and the loss of Matt Moore to the injured reserve list, Coach John Fox hinted that Edwards would see more snaps at quarterback in practice. Edwards was named the emergency/third quarterback for the first time before the November 14 game at Tampa Bay, but did not see any game action. On December 12, Edwards featured at quarterback for one snap against the Atlanta Falcons completing a pass to fellow rookie David Gettis for no gain.

He received very little playing time during the following season. The Panthers released Edwards on October 8, 2013.

Cleveland Browns
The Cleveland Browns signed Edwards on October 31, 2013. He was placed on the team's injured reserve on November 20. On December 23, Edwards was released by the team with an injury settlement.

Chicago Bears
Edwards signed with the Chicago Bears on June 3, 2014. He was released by the team during final cuts on August 29, 2014.

Saskatchewan Roughriders
On February 24, 2016, it was announced that Edwards had signed with the Saskatchewan Roughriders of the Canadian Football League.

Toronto Argonauts
On May 27, 2017, Edwards was traded from the Roughriders to the Toronto Argonauts in exchange for offensive lineman, Peter Dyakowski. Edwards had a breakout season in 2017 for the Argos, playing in all but one regular season game, catching 83 passes for 962 yards with four touchdowns. In the playoffs he caught seven passes for 56 yards en route to winning the 105th Grey Cup. In January 2018 Edwards and the Argos agreed to a new two-year contract. Edwards finished 2018 with a similar statistical line as 2017, with 4 receiving touchdowns and coming up just shy of 1,000 yards; however, the Argos went from first to worst, following up their 2017 championship with a league worst 4-14 record for 2018. 2019 saw the Argonauts with the same record, but Edwards eclipsed the 1,000 mark for the first time, and caught seven touchdowns. He became a free agent once his contract expired on February 11, 2020.

XFL
Edwards signed with the XFL's Team 9 practice squad on February 19, 2020. He was signed off of Team 9 by the Dallas Renegades on February 25, 2020. He had his contract terminated when the league suspended operations on April 10, 2020.

Edmonton Elks
On April 10, 2020, it was announced that Edwards had signed with the Edmonton Eskimos. He played in six games for the renamed Edmonton Elks in 2021 and was released on December 28, 2021.

Career statistics

NFL statistics

CFL statistics
Regular season:

References

External links

Armanti Edwards at Chicago Bears
Armanti Edwards at Carolina Panthers
Armanti Edwards bio at GoASU
Career Recap at GoASU (PDF)

1988 births
Living people
American football quarterbacks
American football wide receivers
Players of Canadian football from South Carolina
Appalachian State Mountaineers football players
Canadian football wide receivers
Carolina Panthers players
Cleveland Browns players
Chicago Bears players
Walter Payton Award winners
People from Greenwood, South Carolina
Players of American football from Charlotte, North Carolina
Players of American football from South Carolina
Saskatchewan Roughriders players
Toronto Argonauts players
Team 9 players
Dallas Renegades players
Edmonton Elks players